Zainab Johnson is an American comedian and actress. She is best known as a semi-finalist on NBC's Last Comic Standing. Johnson is a series regular on Amazon's Upload.

Life and career 
Johnson was born and raised in Harlem, New York, one of 13 children. She was raised by her parents as a devout Muslim. She received her bachelor's degree in mathematics with the intention of becoming a teacher.

Johnson later moved to Los Angeles to become an actress. She took a job as a production assistant for comedy shows and began to cultivate an interest in comedy. She gained wider visibility when she appeared on season 8 of Last Comic Standing. Johnson advanced as a semi-finalist.

In 2016, Johnson appeared on the HBO special All Def Comedy.  In 2017, it was announced that a project created and starring Johnson was in development via Wanda Sykes' production company at ABC. That year, she co-starred in the web series Avant-Guardians, opposite series creator Alesia Etinoff.

She was named to Varietys 10 Comics to Watch for 2019.

Johnson co-hosts the Netflix series 100 Humans. She also has a recurring role in the 2020 Amazon series, Upload.

References

External links 
Official website

Year of birth missing (living people)
Living people
American women comedians
African-American female comedians
African-American actresses
Comedians from New York City
People from Harlem
American Muslims
21st-century African-American women
21st-century African-American people
American stand-up comedians